Stars is Mindi Abair's fifth album. It was released on May 6, 2008, by Peak Records. The album peaked at No. 4 on the Billboard Contemporary Jazz chart, and No. 7 on the Jazz albums chart. Two songs peaked on Billboard's Smooth Jazz Airplay chart, "Smile" at No. 9 and "Out of the Blue" at No. 16.

Critical reception

Jonathan Widran of AllMusic calls the album, "one of 2008's most popular and dynamic urban contemporary jazz releases."

Brian Soergel of JazzTimes writes, "Abair clearly has a new market in sight with Stars" and "Her voice certainly holds up, with its earnest wistfulness carrying appealingly autobiographical songs about love and longing."

Track listing
All songs written by Mindi Abair and Matthew Hager, except where noted.

Musicians 
 Mindi Abair – vocals (1-6, 8, 10), acoustic piano (1), alto saxophone (1, 2, 3, 5, 9, 11), soprano saxophone (2, 4, 6, 7, 8, 10, 11), flute (2), keyboards (6, 7), percussion (8), vocal arrangements (10), all saxophones (11)
 Ricky Peterson – organ (2, 6, 7, 8, 10, 11), acoustic piano (3, 6, 8, 10, 11), keyboards (7), Wurlitzer electric piano (7)
 Jason Steele – string synthesizer (2)
 Matthew Hager – electric guitars (1, 3, 4, 8, 9, 10), acoustic guitar (1, 4, 6), bass (1-6, 9, 10), drum programming (1-4, 6-9), keyboards (2, 4, 5, 6), acoustic piano (2, 4), string arrangements (2), tambourine (3, 9), backing vocals (4), percussion (5, 7), sound effects (5)
 Dwight Sills – electric guitars (2, 4, 7, 8, 10, 11), guitar solo (4), acoustic guitar (8)
 John Taylor – acoustic guitar (5)
 Shawn Davis – bass (7, 8)
 Abe Laboriel Jr. – drums (2, 4, 5, 8, 9, 11), tambourine (4, 8, 11)
 Ryan Dankanich – baritone saxophone (2, 6, 8)
 Steve Tirpak – trombone (2, 6, 8), trumpet (2, 6, 8), horn arrangements (2, 6, 8)
 Richard Dodd – cello (2, 4)
 Charlean Carmon – backing vocals  (2, 4, 6, 7, 8, 10), 
 DeeDee Foster – backing vocals (2, 4, 6, 7, 8, 10), 
 Kenya Hathaway – backing vocals (2, 4, 6, 7, 8, 10)

Production 
 Andi Howard – executive producer 
 Mark Wexler – executive producer
 Matthew Hager – producer, recording 
 Steve Sykes – recording, mixing 
 Josh Blanchard – assistant engineer 
 Brendan Dekora – assistant engineer
 Stephen Marcussen – mastering 
 Valerie Ince – label coordinator 
 Patty Palazzo – art direction 
 Reisig & Taylor Photography – photography

Track information and credits adapted from Discogs and AllMusic, then verified from the album's liner notes.

Charts

Singles

</ref>==References==

External links
Artist Official Site
Peak Records Official Site

2008 albums
Mindi Abair albums